Mark Fowler is a character from EastEnders, introduced in 1985

Mark Fowler may also refer to:
Mark Fowler (2016 character), character from EastEnders introduced in 2016
Mark S. Fowler (born 1941), former Chairman of the FCC